Nothing Matters Without Love is the debut album released by the dance-pop group Seduction.

Chart performance
Released on September 25, 1989, the album was a hit, reaching No. 36 on the Billboard pop albums chart and No. 28 on the Billboard R&B albums chart. The album spawned four hit singles: "(You're My One and Only) True Love" (No. 23), "Two to Make It Right" (reaching No. 2 on Billboards top 100 singles), "Heartbeat" (No. 13), and  "Could This Be Love" (No. 11).

By the end of 1990, the album was certified gold by the RIAA. The album was produced by David Cole and Robert Clivilles.

Track listing

Charts

Weekly charts

Year-end charts

References

External links
 

1989 debut albums
Seduction (group) albums
A&M Records albums